Hertford Rural District was a rural district in Hertfordshire, England from 1894 to 1974. It covered the rural area around the county town of Hertford, but did not include the town itself.

Evolution
The district had its origins in the Hertford Poor Law Union, which had been created in 1835. In 1872 rural sanitary districts were established, giving public health and local government responsibilities to the existing boards of guardians of poor law unions for any parts of their district which did not have an existing urban authority. The Hertford Rural Sanitary District therefore covered the area of the Hertford Poor Law Union except for Hertford itself, which was a municipal borough. Under the Local Government Act 1894, rural sanitary districts became rural districts with effect from 28 December 1894.

Parishes
Hertford Rural District contained the following parishes:

Premises
The council initially met at the Shire Hall in Hertford, as the predecessor rural sanitary authority had done. Administrative office functions were carried out at 24 Castle Street, which was the offices of the solicitors who acted as clerks to the council. By 1933 the council was using the adjoining house at 20 Castle Street as its offices. The council remained at 20 Castle Street until c.1950, when it moved to a large house called Wallfields on Pegs Lane. The council remained based at Wallfields until its abolition.

Abolition
Hertford Rural District was abolished under the Local Government Act 1972, becoming part of the new district of East Hertfordshire on 1 April 1974. The council's former offices at Wallfields were substantially extended to become the headquarters of East Hertfordshire District Council.

References

History of Hertfordshire
Districts of England abolished by the Local Government Act 1972
Local government in Hertfordshire